Japanese Championships or Japanese Championship may refer to:

 All-Japan Artistic Gymnastics Championships
 All Japan Bobsleigh Championships
 All Japan Championship (9-Ball) (9-ball and 10-ball pool event)
 All-Japan Formula Three Championship (racing)
 All-Japan Judo Championships
 All Japan Road Race Championship (motorcycle racing)
 All-Japan Rugby Football Championship (rugby union football)
 All Japan Sports Prototype Championship (racing)
 AWA Japan Women's Championship (professional wrestling)
 F4 Japanese Championship (racing)
 Japan Championships in Athletics
 Japan Figure Skating Championships
 Japan LPGA Championship (golf)
 Japan Open Championship (disambiguation)
 Japan Open Golf Championship
 Japan Open Tennis Championships
 Japan PGA Championship (golf)
 Japan Series or Japan Championship Series (baseball)
 Japanese Chess Championship
 Japanese Heavyweight Championship (professional wrestling)
 Japanese National Badminton Championships
 Japanese National Road Race Championships

See also 
 All-Japan (disambiguation)